Candé is a commune in the Maine-et-Loire department in western France.

History
In the 11th century the village became an important military site for Anjou under baron Rorgon de Candé, at Fort-Castle of Candé.

Candé was noted in 2000-2001 as the residence of Marie Bremont, then the world's oldest person, who died at age 115.

Name
Candé comes from the a Celtic word condate which means confluence. There are two other villages in France with similar names:
Candé-sur-Beuvron in Loir-et-Cher (pop 1,208) -  from Candé.
Candes-Saint-Martin in Indre-et-Loire (pop 227) -  from Candé.

Population
1810 census: 948
1990 census: 2562
1999 census: 2654

See also
 Communes of the Maine-et-Loire department

References

Communes of Maine-et-Loire
Anjou
Maine-et-Loire communes articles needing translation from French Wikipedia